This is a list of people who have served as Lord Lieutenant of Roxburgh, Ettrick and Lauderdale. This office replaced the Lord Lieutenant of Roxburghshire and the Lord Lieutenant of Selkirkshire in 1975.

Buccleuch had been Lord Lieutenant of Roxburghshire and Selkirkshire
 John Scott, 9th Duke of Buccleuch, 1975–1998
 June Paterson-Brown, 7 December 1998 – 2007
 The Hon. Gerald Maitland-Carew, 28 March 2007 – 28 December 2016
 Richard Scott, 10th Duke of Buccleuch, 28 December 2016 – present

References

External links
Roxburgh, Ettrick & Lauderdale Lieutenancy

Roxburgh, Ettrick and Lauderdale
 
Ettrick and Lauderdale
Roxburgh